Pedro Gómez or Gomez  may refer to:
Pedro Gómez Labrador (1755–1852), Spanish diplomat and nobleman
Pedro Gomez (journalist) (1962–2021), Cuban-American sports reporter
Pedro Gomez (dance instructor) (born 1963), Cuban Salsa dance instructor
Pedro Nel Gómez (1899–1984), Colombian engineer, architect, painter, and sculptor
Pedro Gómez Valderrama (1923–1992), Colombian lawyer, writer and diplomat
Pedro Gómez de la Serna (1806–1871), Spanish jurist and politician
Pedro Daniel Gómez (born 1990), Mexican racewalker
Pedro Gómez Gómez (born 1970), Mexican politician

See also
Pedro Gomes (disambiguation)
Peter Gomez (disambiguation)